Nanjian is a town in and the county seat of Nanjian Yi Autonomous County, Yunnan, China. It is the political, economic and cultural center of Nanjian Yi Autonomous County.

Administrative division
As of 2018, the town is divided into one community and thirteen villages: 
South Street Community
Anding
Xishan
Xiaojunzhuang
Tuanshan
Bao'an
Wazhe
Wenqi
Dongyong
Desheng
Yaiping
Fuxing
Baiyun
Xinshan

History
After the founding of the Communist State in 1949, the Nanjian District was set up. During the Great Leap Forward, it was renamed "Nanjian Commune" in 1958. In 1969 it was upgraded to a town. In 1988 its name was changed to "Desheng Township". In 2002, the Desheng Township was revoked and Nanjian became a town after reorganization.

Geography
It is surrounded by Weishan Yi and Hui Autonomous County and Midu County on the north, Leqiu Township and Weishan Yi and Hui Autonomous County on the west, Midu County on the east, and Yongcui Township and Baohua Town on the south.

The highest point is Taiji Peak, elevation .

Economy
The main industries in and around the town are commerce, forestry and farming. Commercial crops include tobacco, Juglans sigillata, and vegetable.

Demographics

As of 2020, the National Bureau of Statistics of China estimates the township's population now to be 49,854.

Transportation
The township is crossed by the China National Highway G214.

References

Bibliography

Divisions of Nanjian Yi Autonomous County